Weimar Marcos Rodrigues (born 9 August 1984), known as Marquinhos Cambalhota, is a Brazilian footballer who plays for Santa Quitéria-PR as a striker.

He played at Lajeadense in the Campeonato Gaúcho.
 
He signed a 2-year contract with Cianorte in July 2007. He signed a new five-year contract in March 2008, but he was on loan to Grêmio Barueri at Série B since April 2008.

In April 2009 he was loaned to Guarani of Série B.

In 2013, he signed for Coquimbo Unido.

References

External links
Marquinhos Cambalhota at ZeroZero (in Portuguese)
CBF 

1984 births
Living people
Footballers from Curitiba
Brazilian footballers
Brazilian expatriate footballers
Cianorte Futebol Clube players
Grêmio Barueri Futebol players
Guarani FC players
Guarani Esporte Clube (CE) players
Associação Chapecoense de Futebol players
Coquimbo Unido footballers
J. Malucelli Futebol players
Clube Esportivo Lajeadense players
União Esporte Clube players
Campeonato Brasileiro Série B players
Campeonato Brasileiro Série D players
Primera B de Chile players
Brazilian expatriate sportspeople in Chile
Expatriate footballers in Chile
Association football forwards